Peter George Daglia (February 28, 1906 – March 11, 1952) was a pitcher in Major League Baseball. He played one season for the Chicago White Sox.

References

External links

1907 births
1952 deaths
Major League Baseball pitchers
Chicago White Sox players
Baseball players from California
People from Napa, California
Twin Falls Bruins players